Monroe Township is one of the fourteen townships of Madison County, Ohio, United States.  The 2000 census found 1,769 people in the township.

Geography
Located in the northern part of the county, it borders the following townships:
Pike Township - north
Darby Township - northeast
Canaan Township - east
Jefferson Township - southeast
Deer Creek Township - south
Somerford Township - west

No municipalities are located in Monroe Township, although the unincorporated community of Plumwood lies in the township's center.

Name and history
It is one of twenty-two Monroe Townships statewide.

Government
The township is governed by a three-member board of trustees, who are elected in November of odd-numbered years to a four-year term beginning on the following January 1. Two are elected in the year after the presidential election and one is elected in the year before it. There is also an elected township fiscal officer, who serves a four-year term beginning on April 1 of the year after the election, which is held in November of the year before the presidential election. Vacancies in the fiscal officership or on the board of trustees are filled by the remaining trustees.

References

External links
County website

Townships in Madison County, Ohio
Townships in Ohio